Ghaziabad is a city in Uttar Pradesh, India.

Ghaziabad may also refer to:

 Ghaziabad Municipal Corporation, the civic body that governs the city of Ghaziabad
Ghaziabad district, a district in Uttar Pradesh, India containing the city of Ghaziabad
Ghaziabad Junction railway station
Ghaziabad Assembly constituency
Ghaziabad Lok Sabha constituency
 Ghaziabad, Karachi, a neighborhood of Karachi, Sindh, Pakistan
Ghaziabad District, Kunar, situated in the northern part of Kunar Province, Afghanistan
Ghaziabad Airport